Lecidea aptrootii is a species of saxicolous (rock-dwelling), crustose lichen in the family Lecideaceae. It is found in northwestern Pakistan, where it grows on exposed siliceous rocks. The lichen was formally described as a new species in 2018 by Memoona Khan, Abdul Khalid, and H. Thorsten Lumbsch. This area has a moist temperate climate, with snowfall during winter and much rainfall during summer. The species epithet honours Dutch lichenologist André Aptroot, who suggested to the authors that the taxon might represent a new species.

See also
List of Lecidea species

References

Lecideales
Lichen species
Lichens described in 2018
Lichens of the Indian subcontinent
Taxa named by Helge Thorsten Lumbsch